Uptown Somerset Historic District is a national historic district located at Somerset in Somerset County, Pennsylvania. The district includes 190 contributing buildings, 1 contributing site, and 1 contributing object. It encompasses an area centered on the county government complex and Somerset County Courthouse, with the surrounding commercial district, residential areas, and cemetery.  Notable buildings include the former Somerset Trust Company Building (1906), First National Bank (1922), County Jail and Sheriff's Residence (1856, 1889), Lansberry House (1869), Edward Scull House (1847), former Somerset Academy (1882), Printing House Row (1872), St. Paul's United Church of Christ (1887), IOOF Building (1889), and First Christian Church (1909-1912).

It was listed on the National Register of Historic Places in 1995, with a boundary increase in 1997.

References 

Historic districts on the National Register of Historic Places in Pennsylvania
Italianate architecture in Pennsylvania
Second Empire architecture in Pennsylvania
Neoclassical architecture in Pennsylvania
Historic districts in Somerset County, Pennsylvania
National Register of Historic Places in Somerset County, Pennsylvania